Montana is a 1998 American crime film directed by Jennifer Leitzes, written by Erich Hoeber and Jon Hoeber, and produced by Sean Cooley, Zane W. Levitt, and Mark Yellen.

Plot 
Claire (Kyra Sedgwick) is a professional hit woman who has been targeted by her own organization. Her boss (Robbie Coltrane) gives her a low level task of retrieving his runaway girlfriend Kitty (Robin Tunney). Once Claire tracks down Kitty, she is unable to stop her from killing the boss' incompetent son (Ethan Embry).

Cast 
 Kyra Sedgwick as Claire Kelsky
 Stanley Tucci as Nicholas 'Nick' Roth
 Robin Tunney as Kitty
 Robbie Coltrane as The Boss
 John Ritter as Dr. Wexler
 Ethan Embry as Jimmy
 Philip Seymour Hoffman as Duncan
 Mark Boone Junior as Stykes
 Tovah Feldshuh as Greta

External links

1998 films
1990s comedy thriller films
1990s crime comedy-drama films
American comedy thriller films
American crime comedy-drama films
Films scored by Cliff Eidelman
Initial Entertainment Group films
1990s English-language films
1990s American films